The railway from Valence to Moirans is a 78 km long railway line in southeastern France. It was built by the PLM and opened on 9 May 1864 to link Valence and Grenoble. The line is electrified, and is double-track over two-thirds of its length.

In 2011, Réseau Ferré de France announced an €80m contract award to electrify the line from Valence on Paris-Marseille line to Moirans on the Lyon-Grenoble line. The electrified connection to the LGV Méditerranée allows occasional high-speed services from points south to Grenoble and north. Construction started in December 2012 and was complete by December 2013.

Main stations
Moirans
Romans-Bourg de Péage'''
Valence TGV
Valence-Ville

References

External links
 Line description
 Line description

Railway lines in Auvergne-Rhône-Alpes